Imam Dashdemir oglu Mustafayev  (25 February 1910 – 10 March 1997) was an Azerbaijani politician and First Secretary of the Azerbaijan Communist Party of the Azerbaijan SSR. Son of a poor peasant, he was born in a village of the Qakh region in Azerbaijan.

In 1928 he graduated from the Zaqatala Agricultural Technical School and in 1932 - the Institute of Agriculture of Azerbaijan (now Azerbaijan State Economic University). Since then he has conducted scientific research works. Mustafayev has been awarded with the Order of the Red Banner of Labour and the Order of the Badge of Honor.

Political career
In 1940, he joined the Azerbaijan Communist Party and received many important encharges. In 1954, he was elected the First Secretary of Azerbaijan Communist Party. In 1956 together with the then chairman of the Supreme Soviet of the Azerbaijan SSR, Mirza Ibrahimov, he was able to introduce a new paragraph to the constitution of the Azerbaijan SSR that for the first time since the Soviet invasion declared Azerbaijani language the official language of the Azerbaijan SSR. As a result of this step which was not agreed upon with Moscow (out of fears of it getting refused) Azerbaijani acquired increasingly an important status in the entire country. This was the main reason behind his premature removal from power. Mustafayev was implicitly accused of nationalism, and on 12 June 1959 he was fired for "not being able to cope with his work" and was expelled from membership of the bureau of the Azerbaijan Communist Party Central Committee.
After being removed from that office, he worked as the Director of Azerbaijan National Academy of Sciences.

References

1910 births
1997 deaths
Azerbaijani atheists
First secretaries of the Azerbaijan Communist Party
Soviet Azerbaijani people
People from Qakh
People from Tiflis Governorate
Azerbaijan State Agricultural University alumni
Central Committee of the Communist Party of the Soviet Union members
Third convocation members of the Supreme Soviet of the Soviet Union
Fourth convocation members of the Supreme Soviet of the Soviet Union
Fifth convocation members of the Supreme Soviet of the Soviet Union
Recipients of the Order of Friendship of Peoples